Gârliște River may refer to:

 Gârliște River (Caraș)
 Gârliște River (Bârzava)